Craig McKay (born in New York's Hudson Valley) is an American feature film editor, story consultant, director, and executive producer.  Recognized with two Academy Award nominations for editing Reds and The Silence of the Lambs, and an Emmy Award for editing the NBC miniseries Holocaust, he has edited more than forty films including Philadelphia, The Manchurian Candidate, Cop Land and Maid in Manhattan.

His directing credits include Bubbe Meises, Bubbe Stories for PBS and HBO's The Red Shoes, written by John Guare.  Story consultant credits include Bravo's Haiti: Dreams of Democracy, Academy Award-nominated Mandela, and PBS's award-winning Witness: Voices from the Holocaust.

McKay has served as a creative advisor at the Sundance Institute Filmmaker's Lab and is also an executive producer on the award-winning feature-length documentary A Normal Life.

He is a member of the DGA, AMPAS, WGAE and Local 700. McKay has been elected to membership in the American Cinema Editors.

Selected filmography
 Thieves (1977)
 Holocaust (1978)
 Melvin and Howard (1980)
 Reds (1981)
 Swing Shift (1984)
 Something Wild (1986)
 Married to the Mob (1988)
 She-Devil (1989)
 Miami Blues (1990)
 The Silence of the Lambs (1991)
 Shining Through (1992)
 Mad Dog and Glory (1993)
 Philadelphia (1993)
 Some Mother's Son (1996)
 Cop Land (1997)
 Return to Paradise (1998)
 A Map of the World (1999)
 Blue Moon (2000)
 K-PAX (2001)
 Maid in Manhattan (2002)
 The Manchurian Candidate (2004)
 Surviving Christmas (2004)
 Everything Is Illuminated (2005)
 Awake (2007)
 Life in Flight (2008)
 Sin Nombre (2009)
 Carriers (2009)
 Babies (2010)
 The Conspirator (2010)
 Ain't Them Bodies Saints (2013)
 Europa Report (2013)
 Tricked (2013)
 The Curse of Downers Grove (2015)

Academy Award Nominations
1982 – Reds (nominated) Academy Award Best Editing (with co-editor Dede Allen)
1992 – The Silence of the Lambs (nominated) Academy Award Best Editing

Other Awards and Nominations
1978 – Holocaust (miniseries) (won) Emmy Awards Emmy Outstanding Film Editing in a Drama Series (with co-editors Stephen A. Rotter, Robert M. Reitano, Alan Heim and Brian Smedley-Aston)
1979 – Holocaust (miniseries) (won) American Cinema Editors (ACE) Eddie Best Edited Episode from a Television Mini-Series
1982 – Reds (nominated) American Cinema Editors (ACE) Eddie Best Edited Feature Film (with co-editor Dede Allen)
1992 – The Silence of the Lambs (nominated) BAFTA Film Award - Best Editing
1992 – The Silence of the Lambs (nominated) American Cinema Editors (ACE) Eddie Best Edited Feature Film
2012 – The Silence of the Lambs was listed as the 26th best-edited film of all time in a survey of members of the Motion Picture Editors Guild.

References

External links

American film editors
American Cinema Editors
Living people
Year of birth missing (living people)